The 2016 World Men's Curling Championship was held from April 2 to 10 at St. Jakobshalle in Basel, Switzerland.

Qualification
The following nations are qualified to participate in the 2016 World Men's Curling Championship:
 (host country)
Two teams from the Americas zone

 (given that no challenges in the Americas zone are issued)
Seven teams from the 2015 European Curling Championships

Two teams from the 2015 Pacific-Asia Curling Championships

Teams

Round-robin standings
Final round-robin standings

Round-robin results
All draw times are listed in Central European Summer Time (UTC+2).

Draw 1
Saturday, April 2, 14:00

Draw 2
Saturday, April 2, 19:00

Draw 3
Sunday, April 3, 9:00

Draw 4
Sunday, April 3, 14:00

Draw 5
Sunday, April 3, 19:00

Draw 6
Monday, April 4, 9:00

Draw 7
Monday, April 4, 14:00

Draw 8
Monday, April 4, 19:00

Draw 9
Tuesday, April 5, 9:00

Draw 10
Tuesday, April 5, 14:00

Draw 11
Tuesday, April 5, 19:00

Draw 12
Wednesday, April 6, 9:00

Draw 13
Wednesday, April 6, 14:00

Draw 14
Wednesday, April 6, 19:00

Draw 15
Thursday, April 7, 9:00

Draw 16
Thursday, April 7, 14:00

Draw 17
Thursday, April 7, 19:00

Playoffs

1 vs. 2
Friday, April 8, 19:00

3 vs. 4
Saturday, April 9, 14:00

Semifinal
Saturday, April 9, 19:00

Bronze medal game
Sunday, April 10, 10:00

Final
Sunday, April 10, 15:00

Statistics

Top 5 player percentages
Round robin only

References
General

Specific

External links

World Men's Curling Championship
World Men's Championship
World Men's Curling Championship
International sports competitions hosted by Switzerland
International curling competitions hosted by Switzerland
Sports competitions in Basel
Qualification tournaments for the 2018 Winter Olympics
World Men's Curling Championship
21st century in Basel